Tookah is the sixth studio album recorded by Icelandic singer-songwriter Emilíana Torrini. It was produced by Dan Carey over three years, from late 2011 to summer 2013. The album was released in September 2013.

Promotion
On 3 June 2013 she revealed that the new LP was titled Tookah. Emilíana played a number of music festivals in the lead up to the album's release in Russia and Budapest. The first single was released late Summer 2013 titled "Speed of Dark", and the music video was directed by Brazilian director Guilherme Marcondes. The album was released by Rough Trade.

On 29 July 2013 Emilíana revealed the radio edition of a new track "Speed of Dark". Three additional tracks were also revealed allowing fans to stream these include "Autumn Sun", "Animal Games" and "Tookah".

Album release
The album was made available for pre-order from 29 July 2013. The pre-order gave fans the opportunity to download the first promotional track from the album "Speed of Dark". Fans could also pre-order a special version of the album directly from the record label Rough Trade in the UK, US, Germany and Austria.

Critical reception

Tookah received positive reviews from music critics. On Metacritic, which assigns a normalised rating out of 100 to reviews from mainstream critics, the album received an average score of 71, based on 12 reviews, indicating "generally favorable reviews." Gemma Hampson of Clash magazine praised the album's production, writing that "There's something magical and mystical about 'Tookah'. A thread of electro runs through these nine tracks, introducing a whole new musical landscape to this singer's stunningly beautiful songs. (...) Every track gives you something new and exciting, while holding tightly on to Emilíana’s flawless voice and melodies."

Track listing

Charts

Release history

References 

Rough Trade Records albums
Emilíana Torrini albums
2013 albums
Albums produced by Dan Carey (record producer)